"Out of Love" is a song recorded by Canadian singer and songwriter Alessia Cara. Def Jam Recordings serviced it to contemporary hit radio on January 29, 2019, as the third single from Cara's second studio album The Pains of Growing (2018). Richard Nowels Jr. co-wrote it with Cara, and co-produced it with Dean Reid. "Out of Love" is a ballad which was inspired by a friend of Cara's who had a breakup.

The artwork for "Out of Love" was unveiled on January 23, 2019. The song's music video was released in April 2019. Cara has performed it on The Tonight Show Starring Jimmy Fallon.

Background and reception
Richard Nowels Jr. co-wrote "Out of Love" with Alessia Cara, and co-produced it with Dean Reid. The song was inspired by a friend of Cara's who had a breakup. It is an "airy, slow and personally deep" song, which was created after a friend asked Cara to write a song about "somebody falling out of love with you". It was serviced to contemporary hit radio on January 29, 2019, six days after Cara unveiled its artwork.

According to Beth Bowles of Exclaim!, "Out of Love" sees the singer "demand our attention as she shows off her her vocal range, her voice smooth and rich as honey". NME'''s Nick Levine called the song a "big, sad ballad".

Music video
The music video was released in April 2019.

Live performances
Cara performed "Out of Love" on The Tonight Show Starring Jimmy Fallon'' on December 4, 2018.

Credits and personnel
Credits are referenced from the album's liner notes.
 Alessia Cara – songwriting, lead vocals
 Rick Nowels – songwriting, production, piano, strings
 Dean Reid – production, drums, engineering
 Dylan Brady – bass guitar, percussion
 Brian Griffin – drums
 Zach Rae – keyboards, strings
 Chris Gehringer – mastering
 Manny Marroquin – mixing
 Trevor Yasuda – engineering
 Chris Rockwell – engineering
 Kieron Menzies – engineering
 Patrick Warren – strings

Charts

Weekly charts

Year-end charts

Certifications

Release history

References

2010s ballads
2019 singles
2018 songs
Alessia Cara songs
Songs about heartache
Song recordings produced by Rick Nowels
Songs written by Alessia Cara
Songs written by Rick Nowels